Gypsum Creek Township is a township in McPherson County, Kansas, in the United States.
 
It takes its name from Gypsum Creek.

References

Townships in McPherson County, Kansas
Townships in Kansas
Unincorporated communities in Kansas